Below are the names and numbers of the steam locomotives that comprised the Bulleid light pacifics, the West Country and Battle of Britain classes of locomotives that ran on the British Southern Railway network. They represented a publicity success for the Southern Railway, with the West Country class highlighting the names of places served by the Southern Railway, while the Battle of Britain locomotives constituted a roving memorial to the fighter pilots who fought during the Battle of Britain, and the actions of RAF Fighter Command as a whole. No. 34066 Spitfire and No. 34086 219 Squadron were at one point in time candidates for preservation, but No. 34023 Blackmoor Vale was chosen instead due to it being in better condition than No. 34066 and No. 34086.

Table of locomotive details
Key to notes: 
 BoB/NA – Battle of Britain locomotive that carried no coat of arms
 C – Complete
 GOE – carried Giesl oblong ejector, fitted 1962 (34064); mid-1980s (34092)
 S – ex-Scrapyard, and awaiting future restoration
 WC/NA – West Country locomotive that carried no coat of arms

Southern Railway batch

British Railways batch

Location links
 Bluebell Railway
 Great Central Railway (preserved)
 Keighley and Worth Valley Railway
 Mid-Hants Railway
 National Railway Museum
 Nene Valley Railway
 North Norfolk Railway
 North Yorkshire Moors Railway
 Severn Valley Railway
 Southern Locomotives Ltd
 Swanage Railway
 West Somerset Railway

Footnotes

References 
Creer, S & Morrison, B:  The Power of the Bulleid Pacifics (Oxford Publishing Company: Oxford, 2001) 
Derry, Richard:  The Book of the West Country and Battle of Britain Pacifics (Irwell Press, February 2002)

External links
 Bulleid Society: WC/BB locomotive summary – Table showing key dates, mileage, running numbers, etc. for all class members

Preserved locomotives
 Wadebridge (34007) Locomotive Ltd. – owners of 34007
 Southern Locomotives Ltd. – owners of 34010, 34028, 34053, 34070 and 34072
 Bulleid Society – owners of 34023 (based at the Bluebell Railway)
  The Battle of Britain Locomotive Society – owners of 34081
 The 34058 Restoration Group
 Restoration of 34046 Braunton @ WSR

Standard gauge steam locomotives of Great Britain
4-6-2 locomotives
West Country
Streamlined steam locomotives
West Country
Battle of Britain
Railway locomotives introduced in 1945
British railway-related lists